"What She Came For" is the fourth single from the album Tonight: Franz Ferdinand by Franz Ferdinand. It was remixed as "Feel the Pressure" for the band's remix album, Blood: Franz Ferdinand.

Background
"What She Came For" originated from the song "Favourite Lie", which was played live in 2007 by the band and featured similarities in arrangement and lyrics.

Track listing 
Digital download
"What She Came For" – 3:33

Vinyl Remixes EP
"What She Came For" (Drums of Death Remix) – 4:18
"What She Came For" (Tigerstyle Remix) – 3:28
"What She Came For" (Lee Mortimer Vocal Remix) – 6:24
"What She Came For" (Lee Mortimer Dub) – 6:25

"Feel the Pressure" digital download
"Feel the Pressure" – 3:28

Remixes 
The song has been remixed by:

Drums of Death
Tigerstyle
Lee Mortimer
Mr Dan (remix called "Feel the Pressure" for the remix album Blood: Franz Ferdinand)

References 
http://wax.fm/vinyl-lp-releases/franz_ferdinand_what_she_came_for_remixes.html
http://images2.wax.fm/franz_ferdinand_what_she_came_for_remixes-RUG326T-1251838191.jpeg
"Blood: Franz Ferdinand" liner notes.

Specific

2009 singles
Franz Ferdinand (band) songs
2008 songs
Domino Recording Company singles